The 2002 Molson Indy Vancouver was the tenth round of the 2002 CART FedEx Champ Car World Series season, held on July 28, 2002 on the streets of Concord Pacific Place in Vancouver, British Columbia, Canada.

Qualifying results

Race

Caution flags

Notes 

 New Track Record Cristiano da Matta 1:00.339 (Qualification Session #2)
 New Race Record Dario Franchitti 1:59:25.063
 Average Speed 89.484 mph

External links
 Friday Qualifying Results
 Saturday Qualifying Results
 Race Results
 Weather Information

Vancouver
Indy Vancouver
Vancouver
2002 in British Columbia